Krukówka may refer to the following places:
Krukówka, Łódź Voivodeship (central Poland)
Krukówka, Lublin Voivodeship (east Poland)
Krukówka, Podlaskie Voivodeship (north-east Poland)